Norton, California may refer to:
Norton Air Force Base, San Bernardino, California, U.S.
Norton, Yolo County, California, U.S.

See also
Norton (disambiguation)